The Cup of Tyrol is a figure skating competition held annually in March in Innsbruck, Austria. The inaugural edition was organized in 2016. Medals may be awarded in the disciplines of men's singles, ladies' singles, pairs, and ice dance on the senior, junior, and novice levels.

The 2020 competition was supposed to be an ISU Challenger Series event, but cancelled due to the COVID-19 pandemic.

Senior medalists

Men

Ladies

Pairs

Ice dance

Junior medalists

Men

Ladies

Pairs

Advanced novice medalists

Men

Ladies

References

External links 
 

International figure skating competitions hosted by Austria